Timofei Vitalyevich Slivets (born  in Minsk) is a Belarusian, and later Russian freestyle skier, specializing in  aerials.

Slivets competed at the 2010 Winter Olympics for Belarus. He placed 12th in the qualifying round of the aerials event, earning the last spot in the final. He was 6th after one jump in the final, but had the lowest scored on his second jump, ending up 9th overall.

As of March 2013, his best showing at the World Championships is 10th, in the 2005.

Slivets made his World Cup debut in December 2003. As of March 2013, he has finished on the podium at World Cup events two times. Both finishes were silver medals, one in 2006/07 and the second in 2008/09. His best World Cup overall finish in aerials is 5th, in 2009/10.

World Cup Podiums

References

1984 births
Living people
Olympic freestyle skiers of Belarus
Olympic freestyle skiers of Russia
Freestyle skiers at the 2010 Winter Olympics
Freestyle skiers at the 2014 Winter Olympics
Sportspeople from Minsk
Belarusian male freestyle skiers
Russian male freestyle skiers